The Supreme Court of the Slovak Republic is the highest juridical authority in the Slovakia and is based in Bratislava. It was established on 1 January 1993, following the division of Czechoslovakia into the Czech Republic and the Slovak Republic. The court is the ultimate appeals court for the lower courts within Slovakia.

Appointment 
The judges of the Supreme Court are appointed by the President of the Slovak Republic after being seen as qualified enough by the Judicial Council of the Slovak Republic. Any person who has fulfilled 30 years of age, is in possession of a masters degree in law and agrees to accept the post of a judge at Supreme Court after having passed the electoral process, may classify for the post.

Roles 
It is the appeals court for the regional and district courts as well as for the Slovak military courts. The court decides in panels composed by three or five judges. The three member panels decide on the matters regarding the lower courts. The five member panel decides on matters which concern verdicts of courts composed by the three member panels of the Supreme Court.

Judges and panels 
The court has four divisions, which are the Criminal Division, the Administrative Division, the Civil Division and the Commercial Division. Each division includes an amount of panels with three members. The Commercial Division has fourteen judges serving in eight panels, the Administrative Division has twenty-eight judges and twelve panels, the civil division has twenty-nine judges and 8 panels, and the Criminal Division has nineteen judges and eight panels.

Controversy 
In October 2020, Supreme Court judges Jarmila Urbancová and Jozef Kolcon were accused of corruption and arrested.

References 

Law of Slovakia
National supreme courts
1993 establishments in Slovakia